Frederick Payne Reid (29 June 1909 – 26 June 1991) was a British sprinter who competed in the 100 m event at the 1932 Summer Olympics.

Life 
Reid was born in England, but raised in Southern Africa, where his father worked as a school inspector in Basutoland (now Lesotho). He then studied medicine at the University of Edinburgh and won several Scottish AAA sprint titles in 1930–1933. He was selected for the 1932 Olympics, but pulled a muscle after starting his 100 m heat, and had to abandon the race. After graduating from University, Reid worked as a doctor in Johannesburg. He resumed competing in the 1970s, representing Rhodesia, and won the 100 m title in the 70–74 age group in a time of 13.80.

References

1909 births
1991 deaths
British male sprinters
Olympic athletes of Great Britain
Athletes (track and field) at the 1932 Summer Olympics